The 2017 Pacific Mini Games were held in Port Vila, Vanuatu, in December 2017. It was the tenth edition of the Pacific Mini Games, and the second to be hosted in Vanuatu (after the 1993 games).

Host selection 
Vanuatu was awarded the right to host the games at a September 2011 meeting of the Pacific Games Council's General Assembly. Nauru and the Northern Mariana Islands were the other countries to bid. The event was originally planned for September 2017 but preparations were delayed by Cyclone Pam.

Both rounds of voting took place on the 4 September 2011 with Nauru eliminated after the first round. In the final round, Vanuatu edged Northern Mariana Islands by 4 votes to earn hosting rights.

Venues 

Korman Sports Complex
Archery field - Archery
Stadium - Athletics, Football, Rugby sevens, Opening and closing ceremonies
Indoor Hall 1 - Boxing, Table tennis
Indoor Hall 2 - Basketball 3×3, Judo, Karate, Netball
Beach Volleyball Courts - Beach Volleyball
Tennis courts - Tennis
Mele Golf Course - Golf
Port Vila Municipal Stadium - Football
Epauto Adventist High School -Weightlifting

Participating nations 
There were 24 national teams that competed at the games:

Medal table
The final medal tally for the 2017 Pacific Mini Games.

Sports
Fourteen sports were hosted:

Note: A number in parentheses indicates the number of medal events that were contested in each sport, where known.

Archery

Boxing

Golf

Judo

Karate

Kata

Kumite

Rugby sevens

Calendar
The following table provides a summary of the competition schedule.

Notes
 No official Tahiti team took part in the 2017 Mini Games following the French Polynesian government's decision to boycott the event. A number of Tahitian athletes competed under the banner of the Pacific Games Council.

 Athletics included four parasport events: men's 100m – ambulatory; men's javelin – ambulatory; men's shot put – seated; and women's shot put – ambulatory.

 Table tennis to include four parasport events: men's/women's singles – seated; and men's/women's singles – ambulatory.

References

Sources

External links
 Official website
 Result system

 

 
Pacific Games by year
Pacific Games
Pacific Games
Pacific Games
International sports competitions hosted by Vanuatu
Pacific Mini Games